BlackenedWhite is the debut studio album by Odd Future sub-group MellowHype. Production for the album was handled by Left Brain. It was made available for free download October 31, 2010, and re-released on July 12, 2011, through Fat Possum Records.

Release

Singles 
The first single "Right Here" was released on October 14, 2010.

The first single for the re-release, "64", was released on June 13, 2011. The music video of the single was released on the same day.

Track listing 
All tracks are produced by Left Brain.

BlackenedWhite (Re-release) 
The mixtape was re-released on July 12, 2011, by Fat Possum Records, without the song "Chordaroy" because the label did not have permission to use Earl Sweatshirt's vocals.

Re-release track listing 
All tracks are produced by Left Brain, except "Game" produced by Tyler, the Creator.

Notes
 The re-release does not contain the tracks "Chordaroy", "Hell", "Loco", "Stripclub", "Gram", and "Based".

Reception

Commercial performance 
BlackenedWhite debuted at number 81 on the US Billboard 200 with first-week sales of 6,000 copies in the United States.

Charts

Critical response 

BlackenedWhite was met with generally positive reviews. At Metacritic, the album received an average score of 72, based on 21 reviews. Aggregator AnyDecentMusic? gave it 6.7 out of 10, based on their assessment of the critical consensus.

Drew Beringer from AbsolutePunk called it "the most accessible Odd Future release to date" and went on to say that it's "another strong album from the Odd Future pack." David Jeffries of AllMusic said, "The original mixtape is worth checking for the Sweatshirt bits alone, but this version does a better job of putting the spotlight on Mellowhype, the Odd Future crew's secret weapon." Evan Rytlewski of The A.V. Club said, "In spite of its marvelous production from Left Brain, who shares Tyler's ear for beautifully deformed grooves and Lex Luger's gift for epileptic bangers, BlackenedWhite doesn't boil over as maniacally as Goblin, and it never fully reaches that album's reckless highs."

Omar Burgess of HipHopDX said, "Ultimately, BlackenedWhite is conflicted, but quality music." Jordan Sargent of Pitchfork said, "The catch-22 for MellowHype is that while their centrism certainly has its merits, their music is unlikely to convert anyone that has, at this point, already written off Odd Future. Which leaves them with a solid, fun rap album to satiate a feverish cult and a growing number of casual fans." Steve "Flash" Juon of RapReviews said, "It's clearly a release intended for hardcore Odd Future fans." Huw Jones of Slant Magazine said, "The duo strikes a fine working relationship throughout BlackenedWhite too, with Left ensuring his colleague's standout bars are accentuated with a quirky sample or a sudden key change. In all, this is a far more accessible affair than Goblin; it never comes close to being as downright offensive, and Hodgy's breezy flow helps make this a far easier album to digest."

Chris Martins of Spin said, "Producer Left Brain breaks ground on bangers that stitch ambient electronica to cracked G-funk, while Hodgy sports the casual swag of Wiz Khalifa or Lil Wayne, with a less cringe-worthy sense of humor than his peers." Jason Richards of Now said, "There's the occasional clever turn of phrase, but MellowHype's brand of vulgarity is subtler and less arresting than Tyler's." Matthew Trammell from Rolling Stone calling it "L.A. gangsta rap for the swag generation that die-hard fans will eagerly lap up." Alex Young of Consequence of Sound said, "The reissue of BlackenedWhite comes as a missed opportunity. Odd Future followers will likely have grabbed the expanded (and notably better) version when it was available free online a few months back; newcomers to the collective's output have better entry points elsewhere in their continuously-growing catalog."

References 

2010 albums
Albums produced by Left Brain
Hip hop albums by American artists
Odd Future